Noon Chill is the third solo album by American musician Arto Lindsay.

Critical reception

AllMusic editor Tim Sheridan described the album as containing "hypnotic rhythms and enigmatic lyrics" and notes that Lindsay's "narcotic delivery is nicely suited to the pictures he paints".

Track listing
"Noon Chill"
"Whirlwind"
"Simply Are"
"Blue Eye Shadow"
"Mulata Fuzarqueira"
"Ridicously Deep"
"Anything"
"Gods are Weak"
"Take My Place"
"Daily Life"
"Light Moves Away"
"Why Compare"
"Reentry"

References

1997 albums
Arto Lindsay albums
Rykodisc albums